This article shows a list of concerts and other entertainment shows held at the Golden 1 Center.  A list of entertainment events are given in the table below in an chronological order.

Events

References

Entertainment events at Golden 1 Center
Entertainment events in the United States
Lists of events by venue
Lists of events in the United States